C0 or C00 has several uses including:

C0, the IATA code for Centralwings airline
C0 and C1 control codes
 a CPU power state in the Advanced Configuration and Power Interface
 an alternate name for crt0, a library used in the startup of a C program
 in mathematics:
 the differentiability class C0
 a C0-semigroup, a strongly continuous one-parameter semigroup
 c0, the Banach space  of real sequences that converge to zero
 a C0 field is an algebraically closed field
 in physics, c0, the speed of light in vacuum
 in chemistry, C°, the standard state for solute concentration
 %C0, the URL-encoded version of the character "À"
 C0, a note-octave in music
 an ISO 216 paper format size
 C00, the ICD-10 code for oral cancer

See also
 CO (disambiguation), the two letter combination